2010 Quetta Civil Hospital bombing occurred on 16 April 2010 in Quetta, Pakistan. Killing at least 12 people and injuring 47 people. The dead included Shia Hazara PPP Member of National Assembly Syed Nasir Ali Shah and his son, at least one of guards, and two Hazara police officers. 
The incident took place when they had arrived to condole the death of a Shia bank manager who was killed by unidentified gunmen earlier.

Background
Pakistan, which has a mostly Sunni population, has seen sectarian attacks against minorities including Shias, who account for about 15–25% of Pakistan's population, and are the followers of the Prophet's progeny. Sunni militant groups like Lashkar-e-Jhangvi and Sipah-e-Sahaba Pakistan which operate freely in Pakistan have for years targeted minorities including Shias. Hazaras who are predominantly Shia have been targeted since 1998 due to their distinct facial features. Sayed Nasir Ali Shah was the first ever Hazara elected to the National assembly and was expected to visit the hospital.

References

Persecution of Hazaras
Terrorist incidents in Pakistan in 2010
Violence against Shia Muslims in Pakistan